The Thirteenth Amendment to the Constitution of Sri Lanka (13A) is amendment to the Constitution of Sri Lanka, passed in 1987, which created Provincial Councils in Sri Lanka. 

This amendment also made Sinhala and Tamil the official languages of the country and declared English the "link language".

History 
On 29 July 1987, Indo-Sri Lanka Accord was signed between Indian Prime Minister Rajiv Gandhi and Sri Lankan President J.R. Jayewardene which stated the devolution of powers to the provinces. Hence on 14 November 1987 the Sri Lankan Parliament passed the 13th Amendment to the 1978 Constitution of Sri Lanka and the Provincial Councils Act No 42 of 1987 to establish provincial councils. The amendment aims at creating provincial councils in Sri Lanka and enable Sinhalese and Tamil as national languages while preserving English as the link language.

However, there are practical problems in devolving land, the police and financial powers to the provinces and the Government has stressed that the structure that is implemented should be acceptable to all parts of the country.

In February 2016, the Chief Minister of Sri Lanka's Northern Province, C.V. Wigneswaran sought India's direct intervention in the complete implementation of the amendment.

References 

1987 in Sri Lanka
13
Sri Lankan Tamil history
Indian Peace Keeping Force
Foreign intervention in the Sri Lankan Civil War
Rajiv Gandhi administration